The Spessart Inn (German: Das Wirtshaus im Spessart) is a 1923 German silent film directed by Adolf Wenter. In 1958 it was remade as a musical film of the same title.

Cast
 Elise Aulinger 
 Fritz Berger
 Fritz Gugenheim 
 Dary Holm 
 Lietta Korff
 Ellen Kürti 
 John Mylong
 Rio Nobile
 Rolf Pinegger 
 Hans Staufen 
 Georg Stettner
 Ludwig Wengg
 Karl Wüstenhagen

References

Bibliography
 Grange, William. Cultural Chronicle of the Weimar Republic. Scarecrow Press, 2008.

External links
 

1923 films
Films based on works by Wilhelm Hauff
Films of the Weimar Republic
German silent feature films
German black-and-white films
Films set in forests
Spessart